Mon Chanthra is a 2013 Thai drama that stars Chakrit Yamnam and Rasri Balenciaga in Channel 3.

Synopsis
Waree (Rasri Balenciaga) is a young reporter who is aiming to write a story about a secretive casino owned by Sama (Chakrit Yamnam), unknown to her they have a history, since when they were just kids young Sama gave her some money in order to take care of her sick mother who later died, but in order to return his kindness to her she save him from being killed by hoodlums in the casino. Now as an adult Waree is disgusted of gambling and casinos because her father was a gambler and abandoned them when she, her mother, and twin sister needed him the most.

Cast
Chakrit Yamnam as Sama
Rasri Balenciaga as Sarawaree "Waree"/Sarasama
Porchita Na Songkhla as Sophie
Danai Jarujinda as Pipat
Sarocha Watitapun as Lampaeng

References

Thai television soap operas
2010s Thai television series
2013 Thai television series debuts
2013 Thai television series endings
Channel 3 (Thailand) original programming